Greg Romaniuk (born August 24, 1971) is a Canadian-American curler from Snohomish, Washington. He grew up in Winnipeg, Manitoba. 

At the national level, he is a 2001 United States men's champion curler.

Teams

Personal life
His brother Leon is a curler too. The two brothers curled together for many years.

He started curling in 1984 when he was at the age of 13.

As of 2016, he works as a mechanical engineer with CDI Engineers.

References

External links

Greg Romaniuk at the United States Olympic & Paralympic Committee (web archive)

Living people
1971 births
Curlers from Regina, Saskatchewan
American male curlers
American curling champions
Canadian male curlers
Sportspeople from the Seattle metropolitan area
Canadian emigrants to the United States
People from Snohomish, Washington
Curlers from Winnipeg